Nimki or nimkin (or namkin), also Namak para (or namakpare) is a crunchy savoury snack eaten in the Indian Subcontinent. It is similar to Mathri from Rajasthan and parts of Punjab and Uttar Pradesh.

Namak para is ribbon-like strips of pastry (made up of refined flour, oil and water) delicately seasoned with ajwain and cumin seeds (jeera) in pure ghee (clarified butter) or any oil. It requires approximately 10 minutes to prepare and 20 minutes to cook. The appearance, taste, and texture can be compared to that of samosa pastry.

Other seasonings can be added to it as well, e.g. dried fenugreek leaves, dried mint leaves, etc.

The name derives from namak ("salt"), the main seasoning for the pastry, other ingredients include atta flour (whole wheat), maida flour (refined) or semolina and baking powder and baking soda. Namak para is one of the favorite snack among most Indian kids.

External links
North Indian Namak Pare (Suvali) Recipe
Recipe of Namak para

Indian snack foods
Pakistani snack foods
Nepalese cuisine
Bangladeshi snack foods
Deep fried foods